Sumanth Ashwin is an Indian actor who appears in Telugu films. Son of film producer and director M. S. Raju, Ashwin made his debut in 2012 with Tuneega Tuneega under his father's direction, for which he won CineMAA Awards Best Male Debut.

Ashwin has also appeared in other films such as Anthaka Mundu Aa Tarvatha, Kerintha and Columbus and Happy Wedding.

Personal life
Ashwin married Deepika, a research scientist by profession in 2021.

Career
Ashwin made his debut in 2012 with Tuneega Tuneega under his father's direction. The film failed at the box-office. His second film, directed by Mohana Krishna Indraganti, was successful at the box-office and was nominated for Best Film at the International Indian Film festival in South Africa. Sumanth Ashwin got his first commercial break with the film Lovers. the film was co-produced by Director Maruthi. His fourth film Chakkiligintha was directed by one of director Sukumar's associates, Vema Reddy. MS Raju had planned to remake this film in Kannada with Sumanth Ashwin himself playing the lead again, but the remake rights of the film for Kannada had been sold before the film's Telugu release.

Ashwin's 2015 film Kerintha is a romantic entertainer in which he played a role of college-goer; the film was directed by Sai Kiran Adivi and produced by Dil Raju under Sri Venkateswara Creations. Later that year. he also starred in Columbus directed by debutante R. Samala and featuring Seerat Kapoor and Mishti Chakraborty opposite him.

Filmography

Films

Web series

References

External links 
 

Living people
Telugu people
Male actors from Hyderabad, India
Male actors in Telugu cinema
Indian male film actors
21st-century Indian male actors
Male actors from Andhra Pradesh
Male actors from Vijayawada
People from Andhra Pradesh
People from Krishna district
People from Vijayawada
Year of birth missing (living people)